LEGO Monkie Kid is a LEGO theme inspired by Monkey King and Journey to the West. It is licensed from the LEGO Group. The theme was first introduced in May 2020. The toy line is also accompanied by an animated television series that premiered in China on May 29, 2020, with the special LEGO Monkie Kid: A Hero Is Born.

Overview
LEGO Monkie Kid is inspired by Monkey King and Journey to the West, which focuses on Monkie Kid and his friends, battling against a variety of demons who are trying to take over Megapolis.

Development
LEGO Monkie Kid is The Lego Group's first product line based on Chinese culture. Although The LEGO Group had previously released LEGO Chinese New Year sets, it was the first time that the company had released an entire product line based on a Chinese theme. Following research in China, The Lego Group discovered that the classic Chinese story of the Monkey King and Journey to the West is widely known within Chinese culture. As a result, the story was chosen as the main inspiration for LEGO Monkie Kid. Simon Lucas, senior creative director commented, "It feels like it was in the DNA of everybody there. So we thought it was a great starting point to tell a new story that's rooted in Chinese culture". The LEGO theme was developed over the course of two years and interpreted the story in a different way to the original. Lucas explained, "The people we spoke to have grown up with these stories, and we wanted to find out what's important to them, and how to interpret that in a new way...So, being 100% accurate to the original was not necessary, really, because we were picking up the key ingredients". The product line does, however, include recognizable characters from Journey to the West.

The designers behind LEGO Monkie Kid had revealed that researching Chinese stories and testing with children were important in the development of the brand new theme. Lego Senior Design Manager Dennis Fong explained, “We felt that we hit something really big when we had this concept of the Monkey King,” and continued, “Seeing all the energy from the kids, the parents, how they could instantly recognize it because we had a lot of key iconic elements in there. And, you know, we didn't need to tell a new story. We had the old story as a foundation for us to build upon."

The initial concept for the theme originated in a rough sketch created by Ned Rogers in December 2021. The sketch depicted several construction sets are transformed into animated vehicles and which parts of the design remain. Featured the concept art are Monkie Kid's Cloud Jet, Pigsy's Food Truck and the Tuk Tuk from Iron Bull Tank. With Lego Monkie Kid theme from The Lego Group was developed as an animated television series, the images showcase how the early set designs were taken and turned into animated models on screens.

Launch 
The LEGO Monkie Kid theme was launched on 16 May 2020. As part of the marketing campaign, The Lego Group released the eight sets inspired by Monkey King and Journey to the West. Each set featured different giant mecha, buildings and vehicles. Minifigures including Monkie Kid, Mei, Monkey King, Mo the cat, Sandy, Mr. Tang and Pigsy were released as well. The sets were designed primarily for children 6+.

Characters

MK's Team
 Monkie Kid ("MK" for short, 悟空小侠/齐小天, voiced by Jack DeSena): The main protagonist of the series. A young noodle delivery boy chosen by Monkey King as his new successor to battle against the forces of evil, he wields Monkey King's golden staff and given almost all of his powers.
 Mei (龙小娇, voiced by Stephanie Sheh): The descendant of the legendary White Dragon Horse and MK's best friend, she is gifted with a dragon aura and her family's jade dragon blade to fight against foes.
 Pigsy (朱大廚, voiced by Dave B. Mitchell): The owner and head chef of Pigsy's Noodles, his weapon of choice is a pitchfork in the toy line with an attachable sausage cannon.
 Sandy (沙大力, voiced by Patrick Seitz): A river ogre who was formerly a rage-filled soldier that became peaceful after going to therapy for his anger. When enraged, his eyes glow purple while his pearl necklace turns into orbs of fire. He uses a crescent staff as a weapon in the toy line. He was also made into a minifigure within the "Evil Macaque's Mech", "Monkie Kid's Galactic Explorer", "Monkie Kid's Team Van" and "Monkie Kid's Team Hideout" sets.
 Tang (唐師傅, voiced by David Chen): A regular customer at Pigsy's Noodles, often telling MK stories about Monkey King in exchange for free noodles (which angers Pigsy for being cheap), it is revealed in season 3 that he has the power of chi manipulation.
 Mo (毛, voiced by Stephanie Sheh): Sandy's pet cat who is seen along with him when going on missions.
 Monkey King (孫悟空, voiced by Sean Schemmel): The legendary hero who famously went on the Journey to the West and battled various demons, he then decided to retire on Flower Fruit Mountain and train MK as his new successor to fight against evil demons while also helping the team on occasions.

Demons
 Demon Bull King ("DBK" for short, 牛魔王, voiced by Steve Blum): Princess Iron Fan's husband and Red Son's father, he is the leader of the Demon Bull Family and the main antagonist of season one. Demon Bull King was defeated by Monkey King centuries ago and trapped inside a mountain for 500 years until he was freed by his family and plans to takeover Megapolis, his weapon is a battle axe, while also cannons and a flamethrower when transformed into a giant, he is made into a brick-built figure in "The Flaming Foundry" set.
 Princess Iron Fan (鐵扇公主, voiced by Gwendoline Yeo): Demon Bull King's celestial wife and Red Son's mother. A cold and ruthless villainess who would do anything for her family to achieve their goals and to please her love, like her husband they both enjoy taunting Red Son whenever he fails at something which makes him try to do better. Even though she acts cold-hearted she does hold a softer side towards her husband and son. She wields a giant magic fan that can summon whirlwinds while also the power of aerokinesis.
 Red Son (紅孩兒, voiced by Kyle McCarley, Stephanie Sheh as an infant): Demon Bull King and Princess Iron Fan's half-demon, half-celestial son. He is an egotistical mad scientist who builds diabolical weapons and has a literal hot temper when humiliated in front of his father, whom he seeks his affection. He later join MK's team briefly to retrieve celestial artifacts to defeat the Spider Queen. It turns out he is responsible for the creation of the three Samadhi Rings due to his power being unstable when he was born. He has Pyrokinesis to conjure fire and uses a gauntlet as a weapon for both combat and to wield Monkey King's staff.
 Bull Clones (牛雜兵, all voiced by Steve Blum): An army of bull robots created by Red Son to serve the Demon Bull Family who are led by General Ironclad (牛將軍), there are also five Bull Clones that are named, Bob (鮑勃), Snort (打鼾), Grunt (咕嚕聲), Roar (怒吼) and Growl (咆哮) in the toy line.
 Gold and Silver Demons (金銀惡魔): Twin demon brothers Jin (金角大王, voiced by Sean Schemmel) and Yin (銀角大王, voiced by Dave B. Mitchell) are a duo of troublemakers who like to create mischief. One time MK got sucked inside an enchanted Calabash by the twins which they make him believe he has a perfect life, but their influence goes awry which made the hero escape (one example being Mei loves him).
 Spider Queen (蜘蛛精, voiced by Kimberly Brooks): She is the leader of the Spider Demons and the main antagonist of season two. She was once a powerful queen a long time ago but not before her empire was buried underground, she then rises to the surface with the help of Syntax and a little girl (possessed by Lady Bone Demon) to conquer Megapolis by spreading her venom to mind control every citizen. She is carried by a robotic spider that acts as her chariot which makes her appear to have spider legs and an abdomen. At the end of season 2, she is betrayed by the Lady Bone Demon, revealing that she was the final ingredient to her plan, and is dragged into the Trigram Furnace, killing her. Her ghost is later used by the Bone Mech in season 3 against Pigsy, Sandy and Tang before it was eventually destroyed. She also appears in season 4 as one of the forms the Ink Demons take to taunt Monkey King of his past.
 Syntax (黯網, voiced by Sean Schemmel): A human scientist that was turned by the Spider Queen's venom to help her conquer Megapolis, he wears goggles and has retractable robotic spider legs on his back he uses for mobility. He is the first of the spider demons to be killed by the Mayor near the end of season 2, with his ghost being used by the Bone Mech in season 3 against Pigsy, Sandy and Tang before it was eventually destroyed.
 Huntsman (獵剎, voiced by Steve Blum): A skilled hunter who serves the Spider Queen that is ordered to track down MK and his team, he has mechanical legs that can transform from regular legs to spider limbs. He also ends up growing a fascination with Sandy, who he comes obsessed with fighting. He and Strong Spider are killed by the Mayor near the end of season 2, with his ghost being used by the Bone Mech in season 3 against Pigsy, Sandy and Tang before it was eventually destroyed.
 Strong Spider (壮漢蛛, voiced by Patrick Seitz): A brute who acts as the brawns of the Spider Queen's army, he has a muscular build with robotic spider limbs for legs, he is the only character never released in the toy line. He and Huntsman are killed by the Mayor near the end of season 2, with his ghost being used by the Bone Mech in season 3 against Pigsy, Sandy and Tang before it was eventually destroyed.
 Spindrax (姬影): A female biker who works for the Spider Queen, she doesn't appear in the series but was only released in the "Monkie Kid's Cloud Bike" set.
 Spider-Bots (蜘蛛機器人): Robots created by Syntax to aid in the Spider Queen's takeover of Megapolis.
 Lady Bone Demon (白骨夫人, voiced by Victoria Grace): A spiritual demon that was sealed within a tomb by Monkey King and the main antagonist of season 3. After being freed by the Demon Bull King she took over his body and tried to destroy MK, only for the hero to defeat her and free Demon Bull King of her possession, Unbeknownst to them she roams the city and possessed a little girl. She then helped the Spider Queen rule over Megapolis but only to betray the monarch by placing her and other 4 ingredients in the Trigram Furnace to create her bone mech, MK tried to defeat her again but every blow just made her stronger which drained him of his powers and destroyed Monkey King's staff. Her name is written as "White Bone Demon" (白骨魔) in the toy line.
 Macaque (六耳獼猴, voiced by Billy Kametz in seasons 1–4 episode 5,   Alejandro Saab onwards): Monkey King's doppelgänger who shares his powers and the secondary antagonist of season three. He and Monkey King were once allies centuries ago, but as he grew more powerful, Macaque was left behind and grew jealous to his opposite which makes him desire to steal his staff, his power and his title. He later joins forces with Lady Bone Demon to complete her goal to destroy MK and Monkey King. As his name implies he has six ears attached to his head along with a scarred blind eye on the right side of his face, but he can easily hide them both with magic to appear normal, he can generate a staff similar to Monkey King's except it has mace spikes at the end of each tip. Unlike his rival he possesses dark magic such as power absorption, phase through terrain, teleporting through shadows, creating copies of himself called Shadow Monkeys (影猴, two which are named Savage (野蠻的) and Rumble (隆隆) in the toy line) and summoning a gigantic smoke monster.
 The Mayor (市长, voiced by Steve Blum): The "mayor" of Megapolis who turns out to be a former chief of war who assisted Lady Bone Demon in betraying and executing his emperor before her entrapment. It's implied that a lot of the Lady Bone Demon's power has been channeled into him, possibly being the reason for his inhuman qualities such as his white eyes and has weird movements. His true form is revealed to be a hulking behemoth. He is betrayed and drained of his power by the Lady Bone Demon and captured by a newly reformed Macaque in season 3, who forces him to tell the heroes about the Lady Bone Demon's plan. He is presumably left in their custody. He appears via the Memory Scroll in season 4, showing a glimpse into the Lady Bone Demon and his past serving under their emperor.
 Bone Spirits (白骨兵): Ghostly warriors who serve Lady Bone Demon, they don't appear in the series but were only released in "The Bone Demon" set.
 Scorpion Queen (蠍子精, voiced by Michaela Dietz): A scorpion demoness that can cast illusions to appear like an attractive woman, she once tried to woo Tang to fall in love with her but later decided that it wasn't meant to be. Her true form is that of a woman with both scorpion claws, legs and a stinger for a tail.
 Goldfish Demon (金魚惡魔, voiced by Michael Sinterniklaas): A small fish demon whose only source of mobility is a glass bubble with two robotic arms, he challenges MK and his team to a game where he has to give them a new engine for the T.E.A., the team kept losing their valuable items with every loss but found out he's been cheating all a long thanks to MK regaining his Golden Eyes of Truth, thus winning the game, regaining their belongings and won the new engine.
 Azure Lion (青毛獅子, voiced by Christopher Sabat): A blue lion who is one of the Brothers of Lion Camel Ridge, and is the main antagonist of season 4. He uses a bronze saber as a weapon.
 Golden-Winged Eagle (金翅大鵬雕, voiced by Meli Grant): A eagle with golden wings who is one of the Brothers of Lion Camel Ridge that uses a spear as a weapon.
 Yellow Tusk Elephant (黃牙老象, voiced by Dave B. Mitchell): A white elephant with yellow tusk who is one of the Brothers of Lion Camel Ridge that uses two maces as weapons, he is designed into a big-fig within the show but made into a minifigure in the toyline.
Ink Demons (墨魔, voiced by Dave B. Mitchell, David Chen, Meli Grant, Johnny Yong Bosch and Billy Kametz in their shapeshifting forms): Demons made of ink who serve the Brothers of Lion Camel Ridge created from the Memory Scroll. They have the ability to shape-shift into the forms of others, which they use to take the form of those from  Monkey King's troubled past in order to taunt him.

Others
 Ne Zha (哪吒, voiced by Johnny Yong Bosch): The young warrior prince of the celestial army who once fought off Monkey King a long time ago who now helps his successor MK and his team to fight against Lady Bone Demon, he wields a spear as a weapon and is carried by two flaming rings under his feet for mobility.
 Chang'e (嫦娥, voiced by Emi Lo): A celestial lunar deity who resides on the moon, she is assisted by Lunar Rabbit Robots (月兔機器人) to help her make mooncakes in her factory.
 Dragon of the East (東海龍王敖廣, voiced by James Sie): The ruler of the Eastern Sea and great-uncle of Mei who was the original owner of the golden staff before Monkey King took it as a weapon.
 Erlang (二郎神): A member of the celestial army that is also the nephew of the Jade Emperor, he is accompanied by a dog and has a mystical third eye. He appears in "The Heavenly Realms" set.
 Lao Tzu (太上老君): A celestial being who was the original owner of the Trigram Furnace, which he used to contain Monkey King for causing a ruckus in the Celestial Realm. He appears in "The Heavenly Realms" set.
 Tudi (土地公, voiced by Dave B. Mitchell): A small tutelary mountain celestial being who resides underground.
 Mr. Dragon (龙先生, voiced by Steve Blum) and Mrs. Dragon (龙太太, voiced by  Stephanie Sheh): Mei's wealthy parents who are the descendants of the Dragon of the West.
 The Store Owner (鞋店助理, voiced by Steve Blum in season 1, Jack DeSena in season 2, and Patrick Seitz in season 3): An employee of Megapolis' shoe store who first encounters Red Son and DBK who are searching for rare item's to absorb, one of which is the beelzebub shoes, he told the two to get back in line which made Demon Bull King take them by force and terrified the worker. He later appears again during the Spider Queen's takeover where he complains to Red Son (who was a cook at a food stand) about the food he made was too hot and burned his tastebuds, he demanded to see his manager who in turn was DBK and once again scares him off, he later stations himself in Lantern City.
 The Commentator (評論員, voiced by David Chen): A citizen of Megapolis who announces most of the cities competitions like the Great Wall Race and Food Wars.
 The Guardians of Knowledge (知識的守護者, voiced by Dave B. Mitchell and Kimberly Brooks): Two large red and blue guards who protect "The Cloud", a place where it connects the world of all its technology and knowledge.
 The Demon Accountant (惡魔會計, voiced by Victoria Grace): A female demon who works for Jin and Yin as there Accountant when they owned Speedy Panda.
 Ai (到): A businesswoman, she appears in the "Monkie Kid's Cloud Jet" set.
 Uncle Qiao (喬叔叔): A businessman, he appears in the "Pigsy's Food Truck" set.
 Lee (小李): The owner of Speedy Panda then later became its mascot, he appears in the "Red Son's Inferno Truck" and "Pigsy's Noodle Tank" sets. A female character named Lee appears in the "Monkie Kid's Team Hideout" set.
 An (一個): A tourist, she appears in the "Monkey King Warrior Mech" set.
 Jia (賈): A tourist, he appears in the "Monkey King Warrior Mech" and "Spider Queen's Arachnoid Base" sets.
 Chen (陳): A photographer, he appears in the "Monkie Kid's Cloud Roadster" set.
 Wang (王): A jogger, she appears in the "Monkie Kid's Cloud Roadster" set.
 Uncle Zhang (張叔): A construction worker, he appears in "The Flaming Foundry" set.
 Rui (睿): A civilian, she appears in the "Monkie Kid's Cloud Bike" set.
 Si (矽): A civilian, he appears in the "White Dragon Horse Jet" set.
 Lu (魯): A gamer, she appears in the "Monkie Kid's Lion Guardian" set.
 Fei (费): A civilian, she appears in the "Monkie Kid's Team Dronecopter" set.
 Brother Monkey (猴哥) and Sister Monkey (猴子姐姐): Two monkey siblings who live in Flower Fruit Mountain, they appear in "The Legendary Flower Fruit Mountain" set.
 Pan (平底鍋): The new owner of Speedy Panda, he appears in the "Pigsy's Noodle Tank" set.
 Huang (黃): A civilian, she appears in "The City of Lanterns" set.
 Han (他們有): A store shopper, she appears in "The City of Lanterns" set.
 Train Driver (火車司機): A train conductor, he appears in "The City of Lanterns" set.
 Citybots (城市機器人): The robots who help out civilians in the city of Megapolis, they appear in "The City of Lanterns" set.
 Heaven Fairies (天堂仙女): Female servants who reside in the Celestial Realm to garden the Peaches of Immortality, they are also known as Jade Maidens (玉女), one appears in "The Heavenly Realms" set.

This series also reference other characters from Journey to the West such as Tang Sanzang (唐三藏), Zhu Bajie (豬八戒), Sha Wujing (沙悟淨), the White Dragon Horse (白龍馬), the Buddha (如來佛), Guanyin (觀音), the Jade Emperor (玉皇大帝), the Dragon of the West (西海龍王敖閏), the Rhino King (犀牛王) and the Four Heavenly Kings (四大天王).

Toy line

Construction sets
According to Bricklink, The Lego Group has released 43 playsets and promotional packs based on the Lego Monkie Kid theme.

A Hero is Born sets
In 2020, eight sets were released on 16 May 2020 and were based on the TV special titled A Hero is Born. A total of eight sets including the Monkey King Warrior Mech, Demon Bull King and Monkie Kid's Team Secret HQ were released. Senior Design Director of Lego Simon Lucas discussed about the Demon Bull King set and explained, “The Demon Bull is such an iconic demon and kept coming up in our conversation. So we wanted to include him as the main demon in this season,” and continued, “Then we wanted to reinvent him in a brand new way, because LEGO is the perfect way to do that. So now we heard from the kids, ‘That's definitely the Bull Demon, but I’ve never seen him like that before.” ’ He's now half cyborg and half bull, and that's really cool.” In addition, two promotional polybags namely the Monkie Kid's Delivery Bike and Build Your Own Monkey King were released. On December 31, 2021, A Hero is Born sets got retired in the Lego stores at the end of 2021

Season 1 sets
In 2020, three sets were released on 1 August 2020 and were based on the first season. A total of three sets including the Monkie Kid's Cloud Roadster were released. On December 31, 2021, the first season sets got retired in the Lego stores at the end of 2021.

Season 2 sets
In 2021, six sets were released on 1 March 2021 and were based on the second season. A total of six sets including the Monkie Kid's Team Dronecopter and The Legendary Flower Fruit Mountain were released. In addition, Monkie Kid's RC Race and Mini Monkey King Warrior Mech were released as an exclusive set and a promotional polybag respectively. On December 31, 2021, the second season sets got retired in the Lego stores at the end of 2021.

Later, three sets were released on 1 July 2021. A total of three sets including The Bone Demon were released. Senior Creative Director Simon Lucas revealed how the design team took cues from a video game to put together The Bone Demon set and explained, “Lego designer Justin Ramsden and I really tried to make the building journey part of the play,” and continued, “Like a video game, there's a battle at each level, and in the end you face the big boss.” In addition, a two key chains with a key chain attached to the minifigures of Monkie Kid and Red Son. On December 31, 2021, the second season sets got retired in the Lego stores at the end of 2021.

Season 3 sets
In 2022, seven sets were released on 1 January 2022 and were based on the third season. A total of seven sets including Monkie Kid's Staff Creations, Monkie Kid's Galactic Explorer and The City of Lanterns were released as well. The Lego Group revealed at the China International Import Expo a brand new set titled the "Monkie Kid's Galactic Explorer" where MK and his team have built a rocket to launch into space, but Macaque's shadow clones try to stop them. The Minifigures are Monkie Kid, Mei, Mr. Tang, Sandy (minifig), a Mo space robot, and two of Macaque's shadow clones named Rumble and Savage. In addition, a promotional polybag set namely Monkie Kid's Underwater Journey was released as well. The Lego Group designer Justin Ramsden discussed about The City of Lanterns set and explained, "What's this extra part of track that's included at the back of the Lego model?! If you're lucky enough to get your hands on multiple copies of this set, then with a very small amount of rebuilding, you can actually combine them to make a much larger City!" and explained, "Finally… to some, this may be the luxurious Lotus Hotel however, don't be fooled! This is actually a candle to celebrate my seventh anniversary of working at The Lego Group. Cheers and hope you enjoy the set!"

Later, three sets were released on 1 June 2022. A total of three new sets named the Dragon of the East, Monkie Kid's Team Van and The Heavenly Realms were released.

Season 4 sets
In November 2022, The Lego Group revealed at the China International Import Expo a brand new set titled the "Monkey King Ultra Mech" will be released in January 2023 and based on fourth season. The set consists of 1705 pieces with 6 minifigures. The set included Lego minifigures of Monkey King, Monkie Kid, Mr Tang, Golden-Winged Eagle, Azure Lion and Yellow Tusk Elephant. In addition, five new sets including Monkie Kid's Combi Mech, Mei's Dragon Jet, Yellow Tusk Elephant and Monkie Kid's Team Hideout were released as well. In addition, a promotional polybag set namely Monkey King Marketplace was released as well. Monkie Kid's Combi Mech and Mei's Dragon Jet can combine. Monkie Kid's Team Hideout and The City of Lanterns can combine into the largest set.

Lego BrickHeadz sets
A Monkey King set was released as part of Lego BrickHeadz theme on 1 August 2020. The set consists of 175 pieces and a baseplate. The set included a Golden Staff. On December 31, 2021, the set got retired in the Lego stores at the end of 2021.

Television series

Lego Monkie Kid is an animated television series series inspired by Monkey King and Journey to the West and produced by Flying Bark Productions to coincide with the release of the theme's Lego sets. The series premiered on TV3 in Malaysia on 13 September 2020, debuted on Channel 9 in Australia on 13 March 2021 and debuted on CITV on 9 May 2022 and Boomerang on 4 February 2023 in the United Kingdom

Episodes

Series overview

Monkie Kid: A Hero is Born (2020)
Monkie Kid: A Hero is Born is a 45-minute television special that premiered on RTM TV2 and TV3 in Malaysia on 13 June 2020, debuted on Mediacorp in Singapore on 27 June 2020, premiered on 9Go! in Australia on 13 March 2021, and premiered internationally on Amazon Kids+ on September 9, 2021. It also debuted on CITV in the United Kingdom on 9 May 2022.

Season 1 (2020)

Revenge of the Spider Queen (2021)
Revenge of the Spider Queen is a 43-minute television special that premiered on TV3 in Malaysia on 27 March 2021, premiered on 9Go! in Australia on 24 April 2021, and premiered internationally on  Amazon Kids+ on October 1, 2021. It also debuted on CITV in the United Kingdom on 17 May 2022.

Season 2 (2021)

Season 3 (2022)

Embrace Your Destiny (2022)
Embrace Your Destiny is a four-part television special/mini-series that premiered on CITV in the United Kingdom on 1 June 2022.

Season 4 (2023)

Theme park attractions 
In November 2021, a Lego Monkie Kid themed land was announced for the upcoming launch of Legoland Shanghai Resort in 2024.

Publications 
A quarterly Lego Monkie Kid limited edition magazine published by CoroCoro was launched from 2021 to accompany the toy line only available in Japan.

Video game

Lego Brawls 

A crossover fighting game named Lego Brawls was developed by RED Games. Lego Brawls was released exclusively for Apple Arcade on September 19, 2019, for iOS devices, and will be available for PC and Consoles in June 2022. It includes Monkie Kid, Mei, Pigsy, Mr. Tang, Monkey King, Princess Iron Fan, Red Son, a Bull Clone, Gold and Silver Horn Demons, and the Spider Queen as playable characters.

Other media 

Lego Masters China has started its first season of the regional show, with a trailer showcasing an upcoming episode based on Lego Monkie Kid.

Reception 
Stephanie Morgan for Common Sense Media gave the series a three out of five star rating and commented, "This animated Lego series is fast-moving, suspenseful, and frenetic, all things that will draw young, hero-loving viewers to it. The Lego Monkie Kid episodes are short, usually around 10 minutes, but each manages a satisfying story arc and a few laughs. Unfortunately, some of those laughs come from mild violence, name-calling, or yelling. Underlying lessons are also delivered as mixed messages. For example, MK breaks something and says "part of being a hero is owning up to your mistakes," but later fails to admit what he's done. Overall, there's not a lot of bang for your parental buck here, but your child will likely be enthralled with the high-quality animation and likable cast of characters."

Awards and nominations 
In October 2021, Lego Monkie Kid was nominated for "Animated Series Production of the Year" by the 20th Screen Producers Australia Awards. It was also nominated for the Animation Ages 11–17 category in the 2022 Banff Rockie Awards.

In December 2022, Lego Monkie Kid Director Sarah Harper was awarded for "Best Direction in Animation" by the 2022 Australian Directors’ Guild Awards.

See also 
 Lego Ninjago
 Lego Legends of Chima
 Lego Ninja
 Nexo Knights
 Lego Overwatch

References

External links
 Official website
 Lego Monkie Kid at IMDb

Monkie Kid
Products introduced in 2020
Lego television series
Anime-influenced Western animated television series
2020s Australian animated television series
Australian children's animated comedy television series
Australian children's animated action television series
Chinese children's animated action television series
Danish children's animated action television series
Works based on Journey to the West